Weeksella virosa is a Gram-negative and aerobic  bacterium from the genus of Weeksella which can cause infection in rare cases. Weeksella virosa occurs in the human genitourinary tract.

References

Flavobacteria
Bacteria described in 1987